The Amazon Family Housing Complex was a residential complex located in Eugene, Oregon, formerly listed on the National Register of Historic Places.  They were demolished in 1995, and removed from the Register in October 1996.

See also
 National Register of Historic Places listings in Lane County, Oregon

References

Further reading 
 "An Ex-Barracks Is 'Home'. Old Oregon 32 no.4 (Apr. 1951): 4, 28. ill.
 "City Region Digest: Amazon housing added to register," Register-Guard, 1996/03/16, 3B.
 "Ruling fuels Amazon skirmish: Housing: The land use board has asked the city to file a report before demolition of the buildings can proceed," Register-Guard, 1995/05/06, 1B, 4B.
 "End begins for Amazon housing units: Demolition: Two buildings are torn down to make way for construction equipment [Il]," Register-Guard, 1995/03/24, 1A, 4A.
 "UO rejects bid for Amazon complex: The sole offer for the historic apartments didn't meet the university's two requirements," Register-Guard, 1994/12/14, 1C.

External links 
 Page at University of Oregon Libraries. Contains an extensive bibliography on the complex.

1947 establishments in Oregon
1995 disestablishments in Oregon
Buildings and structures completed in 1947
Buildings and structures in Eugene, Oregon
Demolished buildings and structures in Oregon
Former National Register of Historic Places in Oregon
National Register of Historic Places in Eugene, Oregon
Buildings and structures demolished in 1995